Tatkon may refer to many places in Burma:

Tatkon, Mandalay Region in Tatkon Township, Mandalay, Myanmar
Tatkon, Homalin, Sagaing Myanmar
Tatkon, Kawlin, Sagaing Myanmar
Tatkon, Myothit, Magwe Myanmar
Tatkon, Sinbaungwe (Tantabin), Magwe Myanmar
Tatkon, Mawlaik, Sagaing Burma
Tatkon, Padaung, Bago (Pegu) Myanmar
Tatkon, Salin, Magwe Myanmar
Tatkon, Ye-U, Sagaing Myanmar
Tatkon, Pinlaung, Shan Myanmar
Tatkon, Kyaukki, Bago (Pegu) Myanmar
Tatkon, Ye-Ngan, Shan Myanmar
Tatkon, Magwe, Magwe Myanmar
Tatkon, Ingapu, Irrawaddy Myanmar